Simpang (Jawi: سيمڤڠ) is a suburb of Taiping, Perak, Malaysia.

References

Populated places in Perak
Taiping, Perak